In Carterian Fashion is the 6th album led by saxophonist  James Carter recorded in 1998 and released on the Atlantic label.

Reception

The AllMusic review by Scott Yanow had awarded the album 4 stars stating, "a remarkable virtuoso who can seemingly do anything he wants on his horns. It is just a matter of passing time and accomplishments accumulating before Carter is thought of as one of the all-time greats...  the dominant voice throughout is James Carter's, who in general is a little more restrained, which makes his fiery explosions and colorful tonal distortions really stand out. Recommended". All About Jazz noted, "The album concept for James Carter's fifth release as leader is the familiar organ combo sound with earthy tenor saxophone. The concept works for the 29-year-old saxophonist, who still manages to retain the other elements with which his career has been associated: overt physical avant-garde taunts, swingin' Kansas City rambles, and polite mainstream lyricism"". Critic Robert Christgau rated the album an "A−", saying, "Just by blowing so lustily and swinging so edgily, Carter puts out more personality and pleasure than all but a few musical word-slingers".

Track listing
All compositions by James Carter except where noted.
 "Lianmo" (Cassius Richmond) - 4:55
 "Down to the River" (Traditional) - 4:04
 "Don's Idea" (Don Byas) - 5:11
 "Skull Grabbin'" - 6:36
 "Odyssey" (Kenneth Green) - 8:00
 "Trouble in the World" (Traditional) - 6:49
 "Escape from Bizarro World" (Spencer Barefield) - 6:03
 "Frisco Follies" - 6:43
 "Lockjaw's Lament" - 7:29
 "In Carterian Fashion" - 6:29

Personnel
James Carter - tenor saxophone, soprano saxophone, baritone saxophone, bass clarinet
Dwight Adams - trumpet (tracks 1, 3, 5, 7 & 10)
Cassius Richmond - alto saxophone (tracks 1, 5 & 7)
Cyrus Chestnut (tracks 8 & 9), Henry Butler (tracks 2, 5 & 6), Craig Taborn (tracks  1, 3, 4, 7 & 10) - organ
Kevin Carter - guitar (tracks 2, 6 & 10)
Steve Kirby (tracks 8 & 9), Jaribu Shahid (tracks  1, 3, 4, 7 & 10) - bass
Alvester Garnett (tracks 8 & 9), Leonard King (tracks 2, 5 & 6), Tani Tabbal (tracks 1, 3, 4, 7 & 10) - drums

References 

1998 albums
James Carter (musician) albums
Atlantic Records albums